Rachel Thorn (formerly Matt Thorn; born May 12, 1965) is a cultural anthropologist and a faculty member at the Kyoto Seika University's Faculty of Global Culture (in the Japanese Culture Course) in Japan.

She is best known in North America for her work dealing with  manga (Japanese comics for girls). She has appeared at multiple anime conventions, including Otakon 2004.  She chose to translate  manga into English after reading The Heart of Thomas by Moto Hagio in the mid-1980s.

In March 2010, it was announced that Thorn would edit a line of manga co-published by Shogakukan and Fantagraphics.

Bibliography
The following credits are for translation unless otherwise noted. Most of the translation credits are as "Matt Thorn":
 2001 Nights, by Yukinobu Hoshino
 A, A', by Moto Hagio
 AD Police, by Tony Takezaki
 Banana Fish, by Akimi Yoshida ( 1–4, translated with Yuji Oniki)
 Battle Angel Alita, by Yukito Kishiro
 Dance Till Tomorrow, by Naoki Yamamoto
 A Drunken Dream and Other Stories, by Moto Hagio (translator and editor)
 Fanning the Flames: Fans and Consumer Culture in Contemporary Japan, edited by William W. Kelly (anthology, one chapter by Thorn)
 Four Shōjo Stories, an anthology of  manga by Keiko Nishi, Moto Hagio, and Shio Satō
 The Heart of Thomas, by Moto Hagio (translator and editor)
 The Legend of Kamui, by Sanpei Shirato
 Love Song, an anthology of short stories by Keiko Nishi
 Maison Ikkoku, by Rumiko Takahashi
 Mermaid Saga, by Rumiko Takahashi
 Nausicaä of the Valley of the Wind, by Hayao Miyazaki
 Otherworld Barbara, by Moto Hagio
 The Poe Clan, by Moto Hagio
 Project A-ko
 Red Blinds the Foolish, by Est Em
 Sanctuary, by Sho Fumimura and Ryoichi Ikegami
 Silent Möbius, by Kia Asamiya
 Striker: The Armored Warrior, by Hiroshi Takashige and Ryoji Minagawa
 Seduce Me After the Show, by Est Em (supervising translator)
 
 Wandering Son, by Takako Shimura

References

External links

Anime and manga critics
Cultural anthropologists
American translators
Living people
1965 births
American expatriates in Japan
American anthropologists
Transgender women
LGBT academics
American women anthropologists
LGBT anthropologists
Japanese–English translators
American expatriate academics
American transgender writers